Nahoni is the notified area and village in Saha tehsil, Ambala district in the Indian state of Haryana. The village is surrounded by Baduali village in north, Kalpi towards west and south and Mullana towards east. The postal code of the area is 133104.

Geography
Nahoni is surrounded by Shahzadpur Tehsil to the North, Mustafabad Tehsil to the East, Shahbad Tehsil to the South and Barara Tehsil to the South. Gola, Khera, Gokalgarh, Hema Majra, Saha, Tumroli, Baduali are nearby villages.

Education
 Krishna Senior Secondary School
 Gurunanak Dev Khalsa Middle School
 Shri Sardar Lal College of Education 
 E-Max School of Engineering and Applied Research
 Saraswati Bal Niketan Middle School
 Girls Senior Secondary School, Nahoni
 Ravi Adarsh Middle School
 Krishna Senior Secondary School
 Gurunanak Dev Khalsa Middle School
 Govt. sr. sec school , nahoni

References

Villages in Ambala district